Menemerus fagei is a species of jumping spider in the family Salticidae. It is found in West Africa, Malta, Egypt, Sudan, Ethiopia, Djibouti, Yemen, and Israel and was first described by Berland & Millot in 1941.

References 

Salticidae
Spiders of Africa
Spiders described in 2007
Taxa named by Wanda Wesołowska